The Korg PS-3300 is a polyphonic analog synthesizer, produced by Korg between 1977 and 1981.

History 
The Korg PS-3300 is one of the biggest and rarest analog synthesizers ever made, and it has become one of the most collectable synthesizers in the world. Only around 25 were produced (according to synth historian Alex Ball) by Korg over a 4-year period from 1977 to 1981 after which it was discontinued. The high production costs of this very complex instrument gave it a price tag that was out of reach for anyone but the wealthiest musicians of the day. It is a much coveted synthesizer by professional musicians and collectors alike as it has a big and unique sound which has been described as an orchestra of synthesizers. It has attained near mythical status due to its rarity and the fact that it was adopted and revered by many of the artists that were the synthesizer pioneers, such as Vangelis, Jean-Michel Jarre, Kraftwerk, Klaus Schulze and Keith Emerson. Even Bob Moog was so impressed with the PS-3300 that after he was given a demonstration of it he is quoted as saying that it was "the best synthesizer for fat sounds". At its release back in 1977, along with the smaller PS-3100, it was a landmark synthesizer in many respects. It was in fact the world's first fully fledged polyphonic synthesizer where all 48 keys could be played at once and articulated independently of each other. Still to this day, the Korg PS family of synthesizers (PS-3100, PS-3200, PS-3300) remains the only fully polyphonic analog semi-modular synthesizers in existence.

Architecture 
The layout of the front panel clearly shows the modular origins of the Korg PS-3300. Oscillators, filters and envelopes are all arranged in vertical narrow strips, much like the front panel of the Moog modular synthesizer with patch points at the bottom of each strip. No patching is required to start playing since all the normal connections have been made internally, this is often referred to as a "semi-modular" configuration and is easier to use than a conventional modular with unconnected modules.

The Korg PS-3300 is actually three complete synthesizer units in one box where each synthesizer unit is almost identical to the smaller Korg PS-3100 and is labelled as "PSU-3301" on the front panel (PSU, abbreviation for Polyphonic Synthesizer Unit). The unique feature of 48-note polyphony means that each unit has 48 oscillators, low-pass filters, envelopes and amplifiers, which makes for 144 oscillators, 144 filters, 144 envelopes and 144 amplifiers in total for all three units. Each Oscillator, called "Signal Generator" by Korg, has 6 waveforms (Triangle, Sawtooth, Wide Rectangle, Narrow Rectangle, Pulse and Pulse Width Modulation), as do the LFOs, called "Modulation Generators" by Korg, (Triangle, Sawtooth, Ramp, Rectangle, Pink Noise and White Noise). The filters have the usual Frequency Cutoff and Resonance (called "Peak" by Korg) control knobs and the envelopes have Attack, Decay and Sustain control knobs plus an unconventional Release function which can be controlled by a foot switch acting much like the sustain pedal on a piano. The envelopes and LFOs are notable for their wide range, for example the Attack of the envelope can be several minutes at its most extreme and the LFOs are very fast, extending into the audio range at their maximum rate.

An example of an LFO-modulated sound on the Korg PS-3300 can be heard on the tracks "Magic Fly" and "Fasten Seat Belts" by the 70s French synthpop pioneers Space 1977 album Magic Fly. Here, they're using the Sawtooth LFO waveform to modulate the Filter Frequency Cutoff to create the fat rhythmic synthesizer backing beat for both tracks, the Korg PS-3300 being clearly distinguishable by its unique oscillator and filter sound. Before the existence of MIDI and software sequencers, this approach was a common method used to create synthesizer beats in the absence of an analog sequencer. Their PS-3300 can also clearly be heard in the intro (and throughout) on the track "Just Blue" and spotted at 0:18 in the video, played by Didier Marouani. The unique sound of the PS-3300 can also be heard on the Gino Vannelli track "Appaloosa" and throughout the 1978 album Brother To Brother.

Each of the three PSU-3301 synthesizer units has its own individual audio output and many Control Voltage output and input options for oscillator, filter, envelope and LFO. This semi-modular design provides a vast number of modulation possibilities, being freely patchable by making connections with cables. There's also a Resonator (see below) per unit and two positional crossfade knobs which sets varying Volume and Filter Frequency Cutoff for a synthesizer unit across the keyboard allowing complex layers of sound to be created when all three units are played together. Further amplitude modulation with the LFO as modulation source can be controlled with the Amplitude Modulation knob, enabling constantly evolving sounds as the different layers fade in and out. LFO modulation of oscillator and filter also have their own dedicated intensity control knobs and here lies some of the secret behind the big sound of the Korg PS-3300. The effect of an ensemble of instruments can be created since it is possible to modulate each of the three oscillators and three filters per key with an individual free-running LFO, for a total of six free-running LFO modulation sources in parallel. Jean-Michel Jarre put the big sound of the Korg PS-3300 to use on the 1982 album Les Concerts en Chine (Concerts in China), and later dusted it off for his 2008 Oxygene Live tour.

Another example of the Korg PS-3300's big sound and prowess as an orchestra of synthesizers can be heard on Keith Emerson's soundtrack for the 1981 American action-thriller film Nighthawks where the Korg PS-3300 was used for virtually all the synthesized sounds, including synthesized orchestral brass, fat Moog-like bass, synthesized timpani and orchestral string effects. The Korg PS-3300 was also heavily used on the Emerson, Lake & Palmer 1978 album Love Beach, for example on the track "Canario". Indeed Keith Emerson loved the Korg PS-3300 so much that he became the official endorser for both the Korg PS-3300 and the PS-3100, appearing in Korg product catalogs and on posters. It was a bit of a coup for Korg since Emerson was known to be a big fan of Moog synthesizers, which at the time was the industry leader.

Resonators 
A much desired feature of the Korg PS-3300 is its Resonators which is a set of three band-pass filters per PSU-3301 synthesizer unit. The frequency of each of the bands can be set with control knobs on the front panel or modulated with an LFO or an envelope to add animation to the sound and there is also a depth control for the level of resonance. These band-pass filters are in addition to the usual low-pass filters that are common to all analog synthesizers. It is these Resonators that partly gives the Korg PS-3300 its distinct sound and sonic flexibility. For example, large synthesized choir or orchestral type sounds (often referred to as "pad" sounds) can be made to sound more authentic and richer than those obtained with just a low-pass filter since the Resonators, when static, can be used as formant filters. There is also great scope for phased, spacey and abstract synthesizer sounds by modulating the peak frequencies of the Resonators as previously described to produce sweeping effects, a much favoured technique used by Vangelis, for example on the track "Chung Kuo" from his 1979 album China where white noise was passed through the PS-3300's sweeping Resonators in the intro.

Vangelis can be seen playing his Korg PS-3300 in the 1981 "Chariots of Fire" video, positioned right next to his Yamaha CS-80, both keyboards can be spotted around 1:40 in the video. The Resonators can be heard in all their glory on the Space track "Blue Tears", at 1:59 in the track a rich synthesizer bass sound is introduced which gets brighter throughout the track in a very throaty vowel-like way, a signature sound that only could be achieved with the Korg PS-3300 Resonators back in the 70s.

Tuning / musical temperament 
The oscillator section of each PSU-3301 synthesizer unit has the usual global tuning knobs; an octave switch with footages 16, 8, 4, 2 and there are separate control knobs for coarse and fine tune as well. However, along the very bottom of the synthesizer unit there is an additional set of individual miniature tuning knobs (labelled "Temperament Adjust") for each of the twelve notes in the octave, making it possible to tune it to scales other than the Western standard of Equal temperament. This is a unique feature for a polyphonic analog synthesizer which allows the Korg PS-3300 to be tuned to exotic scales such as the Byzantine scale or Eastern scales that have a different Musical temperament than Western scales.

Three examples of alternative tuning systems are given in the owners manual and are as follows: 1) Mean Tone System - This is a scale used for medieval keyboard instruments and features a pure Major third. 2) Just Intonation - Which is a theoretical scale with a pure Major third and fifth in C. 3) Hepatonal Scale - This scale divides one octave into seven equal intervals.

Audio mixer and modulation 
On the far right hand side of the front panel there is a fourth unit labelled "PSU-3302" which is a mixer and modulation section where the three audio channels from the synthesizer units are mixed into a single channel with separate outputs and volume control for line and headphones. There are also three external mixer inputs for effects loops or other sound sources. The mixed level can be modulated by control voltages from an LFO or envelope enabling for example fade-ins while playing the keys.

The Modulation part of the PSU-3302 unit comprises an auxiliary envelope with delay and 3 separate outputs which simultaneously outputs the normal CV signal as well as an inverted signal and a voltage offset version of the signal. There is also a Sample & Hold module with its own built-in clock frequency function so no need to sacrifice an LFO, and there are two Control Voltage Processors, as well as inputs for the Korg PS-3010 Polyphonic Keyboard and the Korg PS-3040 Dual Foot Controller.

Keyboard and foot controllers 
The Korg PS-3010 Polyphonic Keyboard is a specialised keyboard with 48 keys and proprietary Honda-made 60-pin connector that connects to the Korg PS-3300 via 60-pin locking connection cable, the Korg PS-3001. The keyboard has a trigger mode dial selector switch with 5 different trigger modes as well as a momentary switch for re-triggering of envelopes during sustained notes, plus three on/off sliding switches. There is also an X-Y joystick with calibration sliders and separate CV outputs for X and Y direction movements, and these can be connected to any of the many CV inputs of the three synthesizer units of the Korg PS-3300 for some advanced modulation control. In fact, if both CV outputs are patched to two of the individual Channel Amplitude CV inputs, it offers an early version of vector synthesis with different sounds fading in and out by moving the joystick.

The PS-3040 Universal Dual Foot Controller consists of twin CV control pedals with variable range, which also can be connected to any parameter with a CV input, adding greatly to the possibilities for expression. The voltage range is set with knobs on the PSU-3302 panel of the Korg PS-3300 and is part of the Voltage Processors. The pedals are made out of heavy duty cast metal and are designed to have the entire foot placed upon them, giving the player the kind of precise control one has for example over an organ volume pedal. (Note! This set of pedals is in addition to the Sustain/Release pedal described earlier).

There was also a junction box called the Korg PS-3050, which was for controlling up to three Korg PS series synthesizers from one keyboard by routing a PS-3001 cable from the keyboard to the junction box and then routing separate cables from the junction box to the PS synthesizers. The other functionality the PS-3050 junction box added was that octaves could be switched on and off selectively for the PS synthesizers, effectively enabling keyboard splits.

Additionally, the PS-3020 37-key monophonic keyboard controller and the PS-3030 Digital Sequencer were proposed, but never saw the light of day.

Software emulations 
A free VST and AU plugin for MacOS and Windows is available from "www.fullbucket.de". A free Windows VST plugin is available from "K Brown Synth Plugins".

Notable artists 
Artists who own(ed) and have used a Korg PS-3300 in their recordings:
 Aphex Twin (owner of three PS-3300 synthesizers, used on the Grammy award winning album Syro)
 Matt Black of Coldcut
 Vince Clarke of Depeche Mode, Yazoo and Erasure
 Paul Davis
 Keith Emerson of Emerson, Lake & Palmer
 François Evans
 Jean-Michel Jarre (owner of two, both spotted at Place de la Concorde concert 1979)
 Kraftwerk (now owned by former member Karl Bartos)
 Lightwave
 Vangelis
 Ryuichi Sakamoto
 Klaus Schulze 
 spAce
 Gino Vannelli
 Stomu Yamashta of the 1970s supergroup Go
 Yellow Magic Orchestra

External galleries 
 Korg PS-3300 Gallery to accompany this article
 Korg PS synthesizers user manuals and information at synthfool.com
 Korg PS-3300 at Secretlifeofsynthesizers.com
 A Korg PS-3300, this is the early model with metal ring knobs
 Korg PS-3300 pictures at sequencer.de
 Klaus Schulze's Korg PS-3300

References

External links 
 Korg PS-3300 in-depth technical article on construction and serviceability "Inside the legendary Korg PS-3300"
 Korg PS-3300 owner's manual and schematics at Korganalogue.net
 Korg PS-3300 resources at Kevin Lightner's Synthfool.com
 Korg PS-3300 at Korg museum website
 Korg PS-3300 at Vintagesynth.com
 Korg PS-3300 at Matrixsynth blog
 Korg PS-3300 at Sequencer.de
 Korg PS-3300 at Jarrography
 Korg history in Sound On Sound

P
Analog synthesizers
Polyphonic synthesizers